The 7th Lumières Awards ceremony, presented by the Académie des Lumières, was held on 25 February 2002. The winners were announced at a press conference at the Hôtel de Crillon in Paris. Amélie won three awards including Best Film, Best Actress and Best Screenplay.

Winners

See also
 27th César Awards

References

External links
 
 
 7th Lumières Awards at AlloCiné

Lumières Awards
Lumières
Lumières
Lumières